Thomas Clare may refer to:

 Thomas Clare (cricketer) (1883–1940), English cricketer
 Thomas Clare (monk), medieval English Benedictine monk and university chancellor
 Tommy Clare (1865–1929), English international footballer
 Tom Clare (singer) (1876–1946), British music hall singer
 Tom Clare (footballer) (born 1999), English footballer
 Tom Clare (lawyer), American lawyer

See also
 Clare (surname)